Rod de Highden (born 15 January 1969) is an Australian distance runner. In 1994 he finished 152nd in the World Cross Country.
He finished 23rd at the 1996 Atlanta Olympics and 28th at the 2000 Sydney Olympics. Highden also won the 1995, 2000 and 2002 Australian Marathons.

Since his retirement de Highden has begun a teaching career at Swinburne University, where he is Sport and Recreation Coordinator.

References

1969 births
Living people
Olympic athletes of Australia
Athletes (track and field) at the 1996 Summer Olympics
Athletes (track and field) at the 2000 Summer Olympics
Australian male long-distance runners
Australian male marathon runners
21st-century Australian people